Candy Chu is a Hong Kong actress for the popular Hong Kong TVB television station.

Career
Chu entered Miss Hong Kong pageant in 2000, she was 24 years old when entering the pageant.
Her goal is to become a successful actress.

Her roles in TVB are minor, but she hopes one day she will have bigger roles to act in.

Filmography
At Point Blank (2001, TVB)
Armed Reaction 3 (2001, TVB)
A Herbalist Affair (2002, TVB)
Police Station No. 7 (2002, TVB)
The Stamp Of Love (2002, TVB)
Take My Word For It (2002, TVB)
Fight for Love (2002, TVB)
Slim Chances (2002, TVB)
The White Flame (2002, TVB)
The Threat of Love II (2002, TVB)
Legal Entanglement (2002, TVB)
Virtues of Harmony II (2003, TVB)
Let's Face It (2003, TVB)
Burning Flames II (2003, TVB)
War and Beauty (2004, TVB)
Love Bond (2005, TVB)
Scavengers' Paradise (2005, TVB)
Wars of In-Laws II (2008, TVB)
The Silver Chamber of Sorrows (2008, TVB)
When A Dog Loves A Cat (2008, TVB)
Legend of the Demigods (2008, TVB)
The Four (2008, TVB)
D.I.E. Again (2009, TVB)
Beyond the Realm of Conscience (2009, TVB)
Born Rich (2009, TVB)
The Beauty of the Game (2009, TVB)
The Comeback Clan (2010. TVB)
Yes, Sir. Sorry, Sir! (2011, TVB)
Ghetto Justice (2011, TVB)
No Good Either Way (2012, TVB)
The Election (2014)
To Be or Not to Be (2014)

External links
Candy's House
Candy's Cosplay Blog
Candy's Sina Blog

1976 births
Living people
Alumni of The Hong Kong Academy for Performing Arts
Hong Kong film actresses
Hong Kong television actresses
TVB actors